ITV Wales and West, previously known as Harlech Television (HTV), was an ITV franchise area in the United Kingdom until 31 December 2013, licensed to a broadcaster by the regulator Ofcom.

There is no channel, past or present, named "ITV Wales and West". The licence relates to a "dual region", meaning that the franchise area was divided into two sub-regions, Wales and the West of England, each of which had to be served by distinct and separate ITV programme services, as more fully defined within the licence.

From January 2014, the dual-region licence was split in two, with ITV Cymru Wales for Wales and ITV West Country covering the both the West of England sub-region and South West England. Both licences remain held by ITV plc through its subsidiary ITV Broadcasting Ltd, and the legal names of the former HTV companies have not yet been changed again, although the former holding company was however dissolved on 7 February 2023.

The National Library of Wales archives now store 200,000 ITV (HTV) film and video items dating from 1958.

History

Harlech Television was awarded its contract by the Independent Television Authority in July 1967, replacing the incumbent TWW. While no official reason was given for the decision, it was believed TWW's preference to base its corporate headquarters in London, rather than within the region, was a key factor.

Harlech pledged to locate its headquarters within the transmission area, based at TWW's former studios at Pontcanna in Cardiff, and at Bath Road in Bristol. TWW refused to purchase shares in the new consortium and opted to cease broadcasting early on Monday 4 March 1968, selling its remaining airtime to Harlech for £500,000. As the new service was not ready to launch, an unbranded emergency service was provided by former TWW staff until Harlech's launch on Monday 20 May 1968. The opening night was marked by a networked variety special.

Initially, the station used the name Harlech Television (after the head of the company, Lord Harlech), but from the introduction of colour on 6 April 1970, this was dropped in favour of the initialism HTV. Other than being simpler, this also largely ended concerns from the West of England that the 'Harlech' branding was only associated with the Welsh part of the dual region.

The initial Harlech board of directors boasted a high-profile line-up including actor Richard Burton and his wife Elizabeth Taylor, opera singer Sir Geraint Evans, entertainer Harry Secombe and veteran broadcaster Wynford Vaughan-Thomas. The board contributed relatively little to HTV's output, although notable productions included several opera specials and documentary series including Great Little Trains of Wales and The Dragon Has Two Tongues.

In Wales, there was an additional requirement to provide a quota of programmes in the Welsh language. HTV Cymru's nightly news programme Y Dydd aired each weeknight in a 6pm timeslot shared with its English counterpart Report Wales. Alongside current affairs, features and entertainment programming, the company pioneered a wide range of Welsh output for children and young people including Miri Mawr, Ffalabalam and pop magazine show Ser. Two of the company's best known Welsh language series, Cefn Gwlad and Sion a Sian, continue to air on S4C.

HTV West was particularly successful in producing high quality children's TV series, often sold internationally. It established the 'HTV Junior Drama Workshop' in Bristol, which auditioned and trained young actors and from which it cast roles for both its own productions, and for other companies seeking young talent. Arthur of the Britons (a historic adventure series), Children of the Stones (a supernatural thriller shot amid the famous stone circle at Avebury in Wiltshire) and Robin of Sherwood were all very popular wherever they were shown.

In addition to networked and locally-produced programming, HTV also broadcast imported output and was the first British broadcaster to air Sesame Street as part of an IBA pilot in 1971 (the programme had been rejected by the BBC). HTV Wales produced far less drama output, although they were contracted to make the ten-part Return to Treasure Island for The Disney Channel in 1985.

In November 1982, the new Welsh-language channel S4C was launched. HTV no longer broadcast Welsh-language programmes, but instead produced such programmes for S4C (along with the BBC and independent producers). The increased demand for programmes in the medium of Welsh encouraged an expansion of HTV's resources. HTV also began to supply local commercial playout for both S4C and the new Channel 4, which at that time, carried regional advertising in the West. The Pontcanna premises could not be expanded sufficiently to accommodate the increased studio production and so a new studio complex was constructed at Culverhouse Cross on the western outskirts of Cardiff, eventually going live in 1984.

Further technical innovation was implemented in 1988, when HTV opened a new presentation facility at Culverhouse Cross, becoming the first UK broadcaster to install Sony Library Management Systems which allowed the automated playout of cassette tapes. Three LMS machines were installed, one each to play transmission tapes into the Wales and West services, with the third used for commercials playout and compilation for S4C in Wales and Channel 4 in the West. 1988 also saw HTV begin 24-hour broadcasting when it launched its overnight Night Club service on 22 August.

In May 1990, HTV acquired the UK branch of Vestron Video International, and renamed them to First Independent Films. First Independent Films was a British film distributor and home video company that replaced Vestron Video International's UK operations.

Due to delays in signing its licence agreement in the franchise renewals of 1991, Westcountry Television contracted with HTV to provide its presentation operations and this service made use of the third LMS machine, fitted with updated VTRs. The service launched on New Year's Day 1993. Around the same time, commercial playout for S4C and Channel 4 became an in-house operation for both networks.

During the same 1991 ITV franchise round, the ITC had initially considered disqualifying HTV's bid because of its business plan, but it was ultimately allowed to proceed. HTV won with a bid of £20.5 million, beating three other companies – Merlin, C3WW and C3W. Due to the size of the bid for the franchise, the company had to make considerable savings in order to cover the increased cost of the licence.

The company made a £5 million loss for the first six months of its licence in 1993, following a cut in the levy paid to the Government. Draconian cost-cutting measures took effect – including a wage freeze, the cancellation of annual bonus payments and further substantial job cuts, beyond the job cuts which had already halved staff numbers to 460. The station also revamped its on-screen image, replacing the long-serving Aerial logo and phasing out the use of in-vision continuity.

In 1994, HTV finally cleared its £19 million debt when Flextech brought a 20% stake in the company for £27 million. Flextech passed on its 20% stake in HTV to Scottish Television in September 1995, as part of its deal to gain a larger stake in Scottish Television. The deal heightened speculation of a potential merger between HTV and STV, which never materialised.

In October 1996, United News and Media agreed to buy Scottish Television's 20% stake in the company, ending Carlton's interest about a buyout. HTV and United began talks shortly after the sale aimed at sharing production services and facilities. United was quoted at the time to have "no intention of bidding for the whole company" but within six months, on 28 June 1997, HTV was taken over fully by United News and Media plc (now United Business Media plc) for £370 million.

United News & Media put the HTV-owned First Independent Films up for sale in 1997, following the commercial failure of the movie G.I. Jane in the UK. The assets were eventually acquired by Columbia TriStar Home Video who retained the First Independent Films label for 2 more years before fully absorbing it into their own label in 1999.

In 2000, Granada plc bought United's television interests, but at the time competition regulations limited the extent to which one company could control the ITV network, and were consequently forced to give up one of its ITV franchises. This resulted in a break-up of HTV, whereby its broadcast facilities and Channel 3 broadcast licence (and hence its advertising revenues) were sold to Carlton Communications plc, owners of Carlton Television, whilst most of production facilities were retained by Granada. Unlike Carlton's other ITV acquisitions, which were re-branded to use the Carlton name on screen, HTV's identity was retained on-air until 27 October 2002 when the 'ITV1' brand was introduced to most of the network.

Granada and Carlton were subsequently permitted to merge in 2004 to form the single company ITV plc, which now owns all of the ITV franchises in England and Wales. HTV Ltd was renamed ITV Wales & West Ltd on 29 December 2006, alongside HTV Group Ltd, which was renamed ITV Wales & West Group Ltd. On 11 December 2008, the broadcast licence was transferred from ITV Wales & West Group Ltd to ITV Broadcasting Limited, the company now responsible for all regional franchises in England, Wales, and southern Scotland.

In 2009, as part of plans to reduce ITV's regional news service to save costs, ITV West's regional news service was merged with that of ITV Westcountry to form ITV West Country. The new programme, ITV News West Country is broadcast from Bristol.

Studios

The company originally operated production studios at Pontcanna in Cardiff and at Bath Road in Bristol. Presentation, transmission and back-office staff for both Wales and the West were based largely in Cardiff. The Pontcanna studios remained open until around 1990, by which time, only HTV Wales' news department was based there. During the 1970s and 1980s, the company also ran a North Wales production studio at Theatr Clwyd in Mold.

In 1984, HTV opened a new £14 million television centre at Culverhouse Cross, Cardiff to replace the original one at Pontcanna. Transmission continued to originate from Pontcanna until 1988, when this transferred to the new centre. In addition to providing playout for both HTV services, the new centre would, from 1 January 1993, also provide transmission of South West England franchise Westcountry Television.

The property eventually passed to United Business Media (then United News and Media) following the takeover of HTV by the group in 1997. However, while HTV changed hands twice more, UBM continued to own the Culverhouse Cross buildings and associated land. ITV plc acquired the site on 10 April 2006 for £18.7m, and sought to redevelop the property. The largest production studio at Culverhouse Cross had been leased to third party operators since the early 1990s. In an interview with the Western Mail, the head of news and programmes, Phil Henfrey, confirmed ITV Wales would decide whether to stay at the site or re-locate to new, smaller premises in another part of Cardiff.

In August 2013, ITV Wales announced it would leave Culverhouse Cross by June 2014 and move into a new facility on the ground floor of 3 Assembly Square, located next to the Welsh Assembly in Cardiff Bay. Broadcasting from the new studios began on Monday 30 June 2014. The ground, on which Culverhouse Cross Television Centre was located, was sold to Bellway and entirely redeveloped as St Lythans Park, a small housing estate.

In Bristol, HTV were based at Television Centre in Bath Road near Arno's Vale, Bristol, which they took over from TWW. ITV plc continue to have operations in the city and today, the Bristol headquarters are home to ITV West Country's news programme ITV News West Country. ITV have however since sold the building to Cube Real Estate, a commercial property developer, which has refurbished the interior of the building. While ITV West Country maintains office space and a single ground floor studio, the other floors are available to rent as office space. The property is marketed as 'Bath Road Studios'.

Transmitters

The Wales and West franchise area operated by TWW was originally confined to the West (comprising Bristol, Somerset, Wiltshire and parts of Gloucestershire and Dorset) and south east Wales (broadly as far west as Swansea) and served by a single main VHF transmitter located at St Hilary. TWW later acquired the use of VHF transmitters covering much of the remainder of Wales from WWN (Wales West and North). An additional VHF transmitter (channel 7) was eventually installed at St Hilary in 1965 to carry programmes specifically for Wales, allowing the separation of Wales and West services. However, St Hilary was never used as part of the replacement UHF network and TV transmission from it ceased when VHF services were switched off in 1985. The mast continues to be used for communications and radio broadcasting.

The UHF transmitter network was designed to replicate the separation of programme services to Wales and the West achieved with the VHF network it replaced. HTV's UHF services were transmitted by the following main transmitters and their relays: Llanddona, Moel-y-Parc, Long Mountain, Blaenplwyf, Preseli, Carmel, Kilvey*, Pontypool*, Wenvoe and  Mendip, with Mendip serving the HTV West region and the rest serving the HTV Wales region.

(Kilvey and Pontypool were classed as 'relays' prior to Digital transmission as they were not 'line-fed').

Prior to digital broadcasting, the transmitter distribution system continued to permit the sub-grouping of west and north Wales, echoing the historic VHF regional configuration. However, it was not particularly useful for programme purposes but sometimes exploited for the transmission of commercials.

The differences between the UHF and VHF networks meant that, between 1970 and 1985, HTV provided three different broadcast services, each with its own schedule of programmes:
 HTV Cymru Wales was available throughout Wales on both UHF and VHF (with the option of different commercials in South Wales and the rest of Wales), and, until the creation of S4C in 1982, included Welsh-language programming.
 HTV West was available in the West of England on UHF only. This service began in 1970.
 The HTV "general service" was available in both the West of England and South Wales on VHF only, and carried a mixture of programming from both of the other services. This service ended in 1985.

The transmitter network has remained substantially the same for digital broadcasting of ITV Cymru Wales and ITV West.

Identity
Harlech's first ident on 20 May 1968 featured two words 'Harlech' spinning in opposite ways and which eventually met up to form one word. This design would have been clearly seen to viewers of the service then, however viewers today would have encountered lots of black lines and a barely noticeable 'Harlech'. This is due to the fact that the ident was designed for 405-line television system used at the time, and due to the use of 625-line UHF system, the ident appears differently on sets that receive the 625-line transmission.

When colour broadcasting commenced on 6 April 1970, a new logo, designed by Frank Pegler and FJP Graphics, was unveiled. Due to criticism from viewers in the West of England, concerning the bias towards Wales that Harlech presented, the new logo featured the letters 'HTV'. The symbol created, named "The Aerial", featured the letters HTV in such a way that it looks like a television aerial – the logo went on to become HTV's longest serving identity, surviving until December 1992. The aerial would animate on through use of lines, accompanied by the same jingle as used before. The white logo on blue background was seen plain when both Wales and the West received the programme, but would otherwise have the region name included. For the West region, this was 'West' at the top of the logo between the 'H' and 'V', whereas for Wales, the caption Cymru Wales was placed at the bottom of the logo, as a reference that Welsh programming was still shown on the channel.

Following the launch of S4C on 1 November 1982, all Welsh language programming was transferred to the new service, and the Wales ident was amended so that only the 'Wales' part was displayed at the top of the logo. These idents continued until 28 September 1987, when the idents were dropped in favour of an updated computer generated sequence, where the blocks flew out of a large suspended blue surface and landed to form the HTV aerial logo on a dark blue background.

HTV adopted the first ITV generic look on 1 September 1989, and it was their slanted 'H; that appeared in their regional section of the ITV logo. Despite the video sequence being the same, there were three variations of the ident, all featuring a different lower caption; HTV, HTV Wales and HTV West. In addition, HTV also made their own variation where the HTV logo remained on-screen the whole time. The corporate idents were dropped on Thursday 31 December 1992.

In their place, a new HTV logo was designed and unveiled on Friday 1 January 1993, featuring an upright, but stylised HTV, with two triangles for the 'V' section. Originally this logo was seen as a translucent blue logo moving back onto a multi-coloured blue background accompanied by an ambient tune. This was later changed to a more upbeat tune, ending in a more noticeable crescendo. This ident package marked the end of specific idents for Wales and the West, as all of the idents that followed used the single HTV brand, though separate continuity for the two services, albeit now out of vision, was retained, this presentation package remained popular until 31 December 1994.

On Sunday 1 January 1995, the ident was re-altered to include small triangles which grew and combined to form the triangular 'V' and the remainder of the HTV logo. The accompanying music was stronger than its predecessor, and the colours were warmer than previous, with a gold HTV and a changing blue, green background and remained on screen for four years until 7 March 1999. Around this time, a large number of specialised idents were introduced – such as variations on the main sequence, specific genre idents and a special presentation package to mark HTV's 30th anniversary in 1998.

On Monday 8 March 1999, HTV introduced what would be its last in-house presentation package, featuring the camera panning over the HTV logo in dark blue against a bright yellow background and accompanied by two remixes to its predecessor (although the tune from the previous ident was used on some occasions). Nine months later, HTV, as part of UNM, adopted the second ITV generic look based on the theme of 'Hearts'. However, when UNM was merged into Granada, the broadcasting arm of HTV was sold to Carlton to comply with competition laws. As a result, from 2 July 2001 HTV adopted, in part, Carlton's star branding. The resultant idents featured Carlton's 'Star' opening films, before the screen flashed white, drawing back to become the 'V' in the HTV logo against the spinning hearts background as used previously.

When Granada and Carlton introduced national ITV1 branding to all stations in England and Wales on 28 October 2002, the HTV channel identity ceased to be used for presentation. It was replaced by the on-screen name ITV1 Wales and ITV1 West of England. ITV1 Wales still used a variation of the generic theme, with the name Wales consistently present under the ITV1 logo. ITV1 West of England's regional identity was gradually phased out from 2002 onward. Originally, prior to regional programming, an ident featuring the celebrity package was used, with an ITV1 logo placed above a small West of England caption to the left of the screen. In 2004, the regional idents changed to four coloured cubes are seen dotted around a regional scene, with an ITV1 logo and ITV1 for the West of England caption in the bottom right corner. This was replaced in October 2004 by a national ident, consisting of three small ITV cubes above a large '1' cube, with the caption West below. This was one of the last idents for ITV West, as regional idents were abandoned soon after, with the exception of Wales. The HTV brand was retained for local News programmes until Granada and Carlton merged on 2 February 2004 to create ITV plc. The Carlton name appeared on endboards from 2001 until 2004, when it was replaced by a generic ITV Wales or ITV West endboard.

Programmes

Current programming
ITV Cymru Wales produces around six hours a week of national news, current affairs and features programming in English – its flagship programme Wales at Six broadcasts each weeknight at 6pm with shorter ITV News Cymru Wales bulletins throughout the day and during the weekend.

The news service is supplemented by regular current affairs programmes including Newsweek Wales on Sunday lunchtimes, the long-running Wales This Week and the political review Sharp End on Monday nights. Several feature series also broadcast throughout the year – including rural feature series Coast and Country, interview series Face to Face, archive series Wales on TV and documentaries such as Crime Files (also produced in Welsh as Y Ditectif).

Since 1982, ITV Wales has also produced Welsh language output for S4C – in the fields of current affairs, features, drama and entertainment. Two of its flagship titles figure among S4C's longest-running and most popular programmes – the rural documentary series Cefn Gwlad with Dai Jones and the investigative current affairs programme Y Byd ar Bedwar.

In recent years, ITV Cymru Wales has returned to producing factual output for the ITV network, including occasional editions of the current affairs programme Tonight and documentaries such as feature series The Harbour, My Grandfather Dylan and the RTS award-winning The Aberfan Young Wives Club.

ITV West's regional programming is confined to news and current affairs as part of the non-franchise ITV West Country service. ITV News West Country includes a 20-minute opt out for the ITV West region within its 6pm programme on weeknights, alongside separate daytime, late night and weekend bulletins. A political programme, The West Country at Westminster is also broadcast on a monthly basis with other non-news content featured during the 6pm edition of ITV News West Country.

 Cefn Gwlad (for S4C)
 Coast and Country
 Crime Files
 Ein Byd (for S4C)
 Face to Face
 Fishlock's Wales
 ITV News Cymru Wales
 ITV News West Country
 Newsweek Wales
 Sharp End
 Wales at Six
 Wales This Week
 Wales on TV
 The West Country at Westminster
 Y Byd ar Bedwar (for S4C)
 Y Ditectif (for S4C)

Past programming

 Arch of Triumph (1984)
 Arthur of the Britons (1972–73)
 Ballroom (1989)
 Barry Welsh Is Coming (1996–2004, 2007)
 A Chance to Dance (1993)
 Definition (1978–1986)
 Garden Club (1991–96, for Channel Four)
 Great Expectations (1991, co-produced with Primetime Television Ltd. and Walt Disney Pictures)
 Elinor (1980s–1990s)
 Farming Wales (1980s)
 The Front Row (1997–2001)
 Hacio (for S4C, 2000–2017)
 The Ferret (1996–2013)
 Jamaica Inn (1983)
 The Jazz Detective (1992)
 Jenny's War (1985, co-produced with Columbia Pictures Television)
 Keynotes (1989–1992)
 The Last Butterfly (1991)
 The Lilac Bus (1992)
 Machinegunner (1976)
 Maigret (1988)
 The Marshal (1993)
 The Master of Ballantrae (1984)
 Mistress of Suspense (1990–92)
 The Music Game (1992–93, for Channel Four)
 Nuts and Bolts (1999–2002)
 Old Scores (1991)
 Oliver Twist (1999)
 On the Road with Elinor (1994–95)
 Poldark (1996) 
 Pretenders (1972)
 Robin of Sherwood (1984–86)
 She-Wolf of London (1990)
 Telltale (1993)
 To Each His Own (1991)
 Three Little Words (1967–1985)
 An Unsuitable Job for a Woman (1997–2001)
 Wall of Tyranny (1988)
 We Are Seven (1989–1991)
 Where in the World (1983–85, for Channel Four)
 Without Motive (2000–01)
 The Woman He Loved (1988)
 Wycliffe (1993–98)

Children's programmes

 Animal Ark (1997–98)
 The Animal Express (1983)
 Bimble's Bucket (1996–98)
 The Bubblegum Brigade (1989)
 Budgie the Little Helicopter (1994–96)
 Captain Star (1997–98)
 Children of the Stones (1977)
 The Clifton House Mystery (1978)
 Dr Xargle (1997–98)
 The Doombolt Chase (1978)
 The Famous Five (1990s version, co-produced with Tyne Tees Television)
 Follow Me… (1977)
 The Georgian House (1976)
 The Great Bong (1994–95)
 Haunting Harmony (1993)
 Into the Labyrinth (1981–82)
 It's Time For Me (1969–1970)
 King of the Castle (1977)
 Kipper the Dog (1997–2000)
 The Little Match Girl (1986)
 Orbit (1973–74)
 Percy the Park Keeper
  The Pig Attraction (1993)
 Rainbow Toy Shop/Days (1994–97)
 Return to Treasure Island (1986, co-produced with Primetime Television Ltd. and Walt Disney Pictures)
 Rolf's Cartoon Club (1989–1993)
 Rubbish, King of the Jumble (1993–94)
 Sky (1975)
 The Slow Norris (1995–99)
 The Snow Queen/The Snow Queen's Revenge
 The Top Ten of Everything (1998–2000)
 Westway (1976)
 The Wombles (1997–98)
 The Worst Witch (1998–2001)
 The Woozies (1976–77)
 Thomas the Tank Engine and Friends (1988) (Welsh dub of the first two series)

References

External links

 

Carlton Television
Companies based in Cardiff
Companies formerly listed on the London Stock Exchange
Economy of Cardiff
Wales and West
Wales and West
Wales and West
Mass media in Bristol
Television channels and stations established in 1968
Television in Wales
Television channels and stations disestablished in 2013